Dexter Roberts (born July 12, 1991) is an American singer from Fayette, Alabama, who was a finalist on the thirteenth season of American Idol, finishing in seventh place, as well as The Voice, finishing in 3rd place. In between his appearances on American Idol and The Voice, he released two EPs.

American Idol
Roberts performed "Drive" for his audition for American Idol, and for the group round he was part of the group Backstreet Cowboys together with Casey Thrasher and fellow finalist Ben Briley, performing the song "I Want It That Way".  For the final solo he performed an original song, "Farmer's Grandson".

Roberts, as a finalist, joined the American Idols LIVE! Tour 2014 after the show.  However, he left the tour after a few shows by mutual agreement due to the illness. He had contracted Rocky Mountain spotted fever due to tick bites during a turkey hunt in Kentucky that he attended soon after the thirteenth-season finale.

The Voice
Roberts was a contestant on the sixteenth season of The Voice on Blake Shelton’s team. He earned four chairs in the blind auditions from celebrity coaches Shelton, Adam Levine, Kelly Clarkson and John Legend. He made it to the finale and finished in third place.

The Voice performances

Career

Roberts signed with First Launch Records and released his first single, "Dream About Me," on March 24, 2015. He released another single, "Country As Country Comes", on February 10, 2022.

Discography

EPs

Singles

American Idol and The Voice digital singles

References

1991 births
Living people
21st-century American singers
People from Fayette, Alabama
American Idol participants
American country singer-songwriters
American male singer-songwriters
Country musicians from Alabama
21st-century American male singers
The Voice (franchise) contestants
Singer-songwriters from Alabama